Kalé Dor Kayiko is a Romani cultural organisation in the Basque Autonomous Region. It was founded in 1989 and has centres in Bilbao, Irun, Portugalete and Erandio.

It promotes both languages of the Romani resident in the Basque Country, Erromintxela and Caló.

References

External links
 Kalé dor Kayiko Official Site

Cultural organisations based in Spain
Romani in Spain
Romani rights
Basque Country (autonomous community)